Miguel Ernesto Pompa Corella (born 12 December 1970) is a Mexican politician from the Institutional Revolutionary Party. From 2009 to 2012 he served as Deputy of the LXI Legislature of the Mexican Congress representing Sonora. He is serving as Secretary of the State of Sonora of the government of Claudia Pavlovich, current Governor of Sonora from 2015 to 2021.

References

1970 births
Living people
People from Nogales, Sonora
Institutional Revolutionary Party politicians
21st-century Mexican politicians
Politicians from Sonora
University of Hermosillo alumni
Deputies of the LXI Legislature of Mexico
Members of the Chamber of Deputies (Mexico) for Sonora